Titus Babatunde Olayinka is the Anglican Bishop of Ogbomoso in Ibadan Province  of the Church of Nigeria.

He was elected Bishop of Ogbomoso in 2015 on the retirement of Matthew Osunade.

References 

Anglican bishops of Ogbomoso
21st-century Anglican bishops in Nigeria
Nigerian Anglicans
Year of birth missing (living people)
Living people